Jerome Alley (1760–1826) was an Irish poet and author. After being educated at, and taking his degree from, Trinity College, Dublin, he became Rector of Drumcar in diocese of Armagh. A Compendium of Irish Biography states that "He ... was the author of several poems and pamphlets. In 1826, shortly before his death, he published a work upon the various religions of the world."

External links
 http://www.libraryireland.com/biography/JeromeAlley.php
 

Irish poets
18th-century Irish poets
18th-century Irish male writers
19th-century Irish poets
1760 births
1826 deaths